The Virgen de Copacabana (literal translation: Virgin of Copacabana; figurative translation: Our Lady of Copacabana; variant: Blessed Virgin of the Candelaria, Our Lady of Copacabana) is the patron saint of Bolivia. She is venerated in Bolivia during her feast day of 2 February, the day of the Purification of Mary, or feast of the Virgen de la Candelaria.  She is also venerated on 5 August with her own liturgy and popular celebration.

Pope Pius XI granted the image a decree of Canonical coronation on 29 July 1925 and was crowned on 1 August the same year.

History
Copacabana is a Bolivian town located on a peninsula at the southeastern shore of Lake Titicaca. It is close to Isla del Sol and Isla de la Luna, islands sacred to the Aymara and Quechua. In the mid 16th century, the inhabitants of Copacabana were divided into two groups: Anansayas (Inca newcomers) and Urinsayas (the traditional residents of the region). Despite conversion to Christianity, they continued an attachment to their original religion. Poor harvests lead them to consider attracting favor from heaven through a new confraternity. The Anansayas resolved to venerate the Virgin Mary while the Urinsayas selected San Sebastian.

Francisco Tito Yupanqui, an amateur sculptor, a descendant of the Inca Huayna Capac, and a member of the Anansayas, did not abandon the idea. He decided to create an image of the Madonna, believing it would influence the local people. Using clay, and assisted by his brother Philip, Francisco Tito created the image of the Virgin. The sculpture was placed at the side of the altar by the pastor, Father Antonio de Almedio. After Father Antonio left Copacabana, the priest Don Antonio Montoro took over. Unhappy with the look of the coarse and disproportionate sculpture, he ordered that it be removed from the altar and be placed in a corner of the sacristy.

Francisco Tito was humbled by this setback. Advised by relatives, he went to Potosi which had outstanding teachers of sacred image sculpting. While studying in the workshop of Maestro Diego Ortiz, Francisco Tito gained expertise in sculpture and in wood carving. With this skill, he resolved to create an improved image of the Candelaria. He looked through the churches of Potosí for an image of the Virgin which could serve as a model, finally finding the best one in the Convent of Santo Domingo to the Virgen del Rosario. He studied it closely to remember it before starting his new piece and held a Mass in honor of the Holy Trinity as a divine blessing for his work.

The Urinsayas accepted the establishment of the Virgin Mary confraternity, but they did not accept Francisco Tito's carving, and decided to sell it. In La Paz, the picture reached the priest of Copacabana who decided he would bring the image to the people. On 2 February 1583, the image of Mary was brought to the hills of Guaçu. A series of miracles attributed to the icon made it one of the oldest Marian shrines in the Americas, along with Guadalupe in Mexico.

On August 1, 1925, during the Papal visit of Pope Pius XI to Bolivia, the image of the Virgin of Copacabana was blessed and granted a canonical coronation. Attending the coronation were three Bolivian bishops, President Bautista Saavedra and ambassadors representing Argentina and Peru.

Construction of the basilica

From its beginning, the image gained a reputation for being a miracle. The Augustinians built their first chapel between the 1614 and 1618, and later, the Viceroy of Peru, Conde de Lemos, morally and financially supported the construction of a basilica to honor the Virgin. Construction of the Basilica of Our Lady of Copacabana began in 1668, was inaugurated in 1678, and was completed by 1805. Subsequently, the faithful donated embellishments to the image, including valuable jewels, and the temple was filled with gifts and treasures.

In 1825, when Bolivia gained independence, it was attributed to the faith of the population through the Virgin of Copacabana. However, in 1826, Marshal Antonio José de Sucre, the President of the Republic of Bolivia, expropriated all the jewels and colonial treasures at the Shrine of the Virgin, using them to create the first coins from Bolivia.

Carving description
The body of the image measures about four feet, carved in maguey wood and is laminated in gold leaf. The clothes are that of an Inca princess. The form is covered with luxurious robes and dresses, and wears a wig of long, natural hair. It holds the Child Jesus in a peculiar position, as if about to fall. In her right hand, she holds a basket and a  gold baton, a gift and souvenir of the visit in 1669 from the Viceroy of Peru.

The original image never leaves the sanctuary; a copy is used for processions. Those leaving the shrine walk backwards with the intention not to turn their backs on the Virgin.

Devotion in other regions
]
The veneration of the Virgin of Copacabana was not limited to this region, but rapidly expanded to the whole Viceroyalty of Peru, and was even said to be the Patron of the country. In Lima, the Viceroy of Peru decided to build a Church for the Virgin after an image of her survived the earthquake of 1687. 

During the 17th and 18th century, this marian apparition was also venerated in Spain and Italy, where many paintings and literary books were made. 

The Bolivian community in Argentina celebrates the Feast of the Virgin of Copacabana in Buenos Aires in October.

2013 Robbery
In the early hours of Monday 22 April 2013 the sanctuary of Copacabana was robbed and the image of the Virgen de Copacabana was stripped of her gold and silver accessories. Initial reports indicate that twenty-eight items, including the sculpture of the baby Jesus, were removed from the Virgen de Copacabana by thieves who entered the building using a ladder stolen from a nearby telecommunications station.

The Saturday 6 July 2013 the town of Copacabana restored the image of the Virgin with new jewelry.

Further reading
Alcalá, Luisa Elena. "Beginnings: Art, Time and Francisco Yupanqui's Virgin of Copacabana" in Arts of South America, 1492-1850, ed. Donna Pierce, pp. 141–68. Denver: Denver Art Museum 2010.

References

External links
 Our Lady of Copacabana, Bolivia 
 Virgin of Copacabana, Patron Saint 
 Virgin of Copacabana 
 Copacabana: A Virgin venerated in Brazil 

Copacab
Titles of Mary
Catholic Church in Bolivia
Bolivian culture
Viceroyalty of Peru